Kamarkhola Union is a union of Dacope Upazila in Khulna District of Bangladesh.

Geography
The area of Kamarkhola Union is 29.20 square kilometers. To the north of the union are the Dhaki River and Bhodra River, Sutarkhali Union in the south, Bhadra river on the east and Dhaki river on the west.

References

Unions of Dacope Upazila
Populated places in Khulna Division
Populated places in Khulna District